Digital Technologies and the Museum Experience (2008), edited by Loïc Tallon and Kevin Walker, is a book about the use of digital technology by museums.

Overview
The book is divided into 11 contributed chapters by a variety of authors, in two parts, Defining the Context: Three Perspectives and Delivering Potential. The book includes a foreword by James M. Bradburne and introduction by Loïc Tallon. There is also a bibliography, index, and short biographies of contributors. The book is available in cloth, paperback, and electronic versions.

Contributors
The following authors contributed to chapters in the book:

Jonathan P. Bowen
Alexandra Burch
Lynn D. Dierking
John H. Falk
Silvia Filippini-Fantoni
Ben Gammon
Ellen Giusti
Halina Gottlieb
Sherry Hsi
Peter Lonsdale
Julia Meek
Ross Parry
Peter Samis
Mike Sharples
Jeffrey K. Smith
Pablo P. L. Tinio
Giasemi Vavoula
Kevin Walker

Reviews
The book has been reviewed in a number of journals, including:

 Educational Technology.
 International Journal of Heritage Studies.
 Library Hi Tech.
 MedieKultur: Journal of Media and Communication Research.
 Science Education.
 Visitor Studies.

See also
 Museums and Digital Culture: New Perspectives and Research (2019)

References

External links
Book extract by Loïc Tallon
Amazon USA information
Amazon UK information

2008 non-fiction books
Technology books
Museum books
Museum informatics
Digital humanities
Digital technology